Aharon Keshales (born 16 April 1976) is an Israeli film director, screenwriter, and film critic.

Biography
Keshales was born in Jaffa, Israel, to a Sephardic Jewish family. He grew up in Bat Yam, Israel. He served as a soldier in the Intelligence Corps of the Israel Defense Forces. Then studied at the Tel Aviv University's film school, where he later became a lecturer until completing his graduate degree in the interdisciplinary program at the Faculty of Arts.

At the same time, Keshales worked as film critic for Ynet, Globes, and Rating Magazine; and also created the film blog "Piranha Karina".

Career
In 2010, his directorial debut film, Rabies (Kalevet) was released, a film which he co-wrote and co-directed with Navot Papushado. In 2013 their second joint film came out - Big Bad Wolves.

Filmography (as director)
Rabies (2010, with Navot Papushado)
Big Bad Wolves (2013, with Navot Papushado)
ABCs of Death 2 (Segment: F is for Falling) (2014, with Navot Papushado)
South of Heaven (2021, USA)

Awards

References

External links

1976 births
Living people
Israeli film directors
Israeli male screenwriters
Israeli film critics
Israeli Sephardi Jews
People from Jaffa
People from Bat Yam
Tel Aviv University alumni